Brian Radford (birth unknown – ) was a Welsh rugby union, and professional rugby league footballer who played in the 1940s and 1950s.

Background
Brian Radford was born in Kenfig Hill, Wales, and he died in Kenfig Hill, Wales.

Playing career

International honours
Brian Radford won a cap for Wales while Bradford Northern in 1952.

Championship final appearances
Brian Radford played right-, i.e. number 10, in Bradford Northern's 6-13 defeat by Wigan in the Championship Final during the 1951–52 season at Leeds Road, Huddersfield on Saturday 10 May 1952.

Challenge Cup Final appearances

References

External links
Photograph "Northern Greats" at rlhp.co.uk
 First Class Players at kenfighillrfc.org.uk

Aberavon RFC players
Bradford Bulls players
Kenfig Hill RFC players
Neath RFC players
Rugby league players from Bridgend County Borough
Rugby league props
Rugby league second-rows
Rugby union players from Kenfig Hill
Wales national rugby league team players
Welsh rugby league players
Welsh rugby union players
Year of birth missing
Year of death missing